Incisura is Latin for "notch", and may refer to:

 Incisura (gastropod), a genus of keyhole limpets
 Angular incisure, which varies somewhat in position with the state of distension of the viscus
 Suprascapular notch, a notch in the superior border of the scapula, just medial to the base of the coracoid process
 It may also sometimes refer to the Dicrotic notch seen with aorta pressure
 Cardiac notch of stomach (incisura cardiaca), where the left margin of the oesophagus joins the greater curvature of the stomach